The 1995 Sweater Shop International Open was a professional ranking snooker tournament that took place between 13 and 19 February 1995 at the Bournemouth International Centre in Bournemouth, England.

John Higgins won the title by defeating Steve Davis 9–5 in the final. The defending champion John Parrott was defeated by Higgins in the semi-finals.


Main draw

References

Scottish Open (snooker)
International Open
International Open
International Open
Sport in Bournemouth